Justin Anthony Carter (born April 21, 1987) is an American professional basketball player who last played for Oradea in the Romanian League. He played college basketball for Creighton.

Professional career
After going undrafted in the 2010 NBA draft, Carter moved to Slovakia for the 2010–11 season, signed by BK Vahostav-SK Zilina. After that, he moved to Turkey to play there for several teams. Most recently he has played for Uşak Sportif of the Turkish Basketball League (TBL).

On December 29, 2014, Carter signed with Galatasaray Liv Hospital of Turkey for the rest of the 2014–15 season.

In July 2015, Carter joined the Phoenix Suns for the 2015 Las Vegas Summer League. On July 28, 2015, he returned to Turkey and signed with Pınar Karşıyaka. In late January 2016, he left Karşıyaka and signed with Guangdong Southern Tigers of China for the rest of the 2015–16 CBA season.

On August 26, 2016, Carter signed with Russian club Khimki for the 2016–17 season. On October 25, 2016, he was waived by Khimki after appearing in four games. Two days later, he signed with Israeli club Maccabi Kiryat Gat.

On August 17, 2017, Carter signed with Kazakhstani team Astana for the 2017–18 season. On September 30, 2018, he signed with Shabab Al Ahli of the UAE National Basketball League.

In January 2019, Carter signed with Dinamo Sassari of the Italian Lega Basket Serie A (LBA). On May 1, 2019, he won the FIBA Europe Cup with Dinamo.

On July 29, Carter signed with Chorale Roanne in the French LNB Pro A. Unfortunately the team was forced to withdraw the contract earlier: on 9th of December Chorale Roanne, indeed, announced the recission after the violent reaction against two players during the match against Élan Béarnais, played on the 30th of November which caused his deferment for 10 matches.

In the end of January he signed with Pallacanestro Varese until the end of the 2019–20 season.

On September 18, 2020, Carter signed with Zadar in the Croatian League and ABA League. He averaged 11.9 points, 2 assist and 1.1 steals per game in ABA Liga. Carter re-signed with the team on July 25, 2021.

In August 2022, after two seasons spent in Zadar, Carter moved to Oradea of the Romanian League.

Career statistics

EuroLeague

|-
| style="text-align:left;"| 2014–15
| style="text-align:left;"| Galatasaray
| 14 || 6 || 25.7 || .436 || .290 || .694 || 4.3 || 2.6 || .7 || .5 || 8.3 || 12.5
|- class="sortbottom"
| style="text-align:center;" colspan=2 | Career
| 14 || 6 || 25.7 || .436 || .290 || .694 || 4.3 || 2.6 || .7 || .5 || 8.3 || 12.5

References

External links
 Justin Carter at euroleague.net
 Justin Carter at realgm.com
 Justin Carter at tblstat.net

1987 births
Living people
ABA League players
American expatriate basketball people in China
American expatriate basketball people in Croatia
American expatriate basketball people in Israel
American expatriate basketball people in Italy
American expatriate basketball people in Kazakhstan
American expatriate basketball people in Russia
American expatriate basketball people in Slovakia
American expatriate basketball people in Turkey
American expatriate basketball people in the United Arab Emirates
American men's basketball players
Basketball players from Maryland
BC Astana players
BC Khimki players
Chorale Roanne Basket players
Creighton Bluejays men's basketball players
Dinamo Sassari players
Galatasaray S.K. (men's basketball) players
Guangdong Southern Tigers players
Fullerton Hornets men's basketball players
Karşıyaka basketball players
KK Zadar players
Lega Basket Serie A players
Maccabi Kiryat Gat B.C. players
People from Gaithersburg, Maryland
Shooting guards
Sportspeople from Montgomery County, Maryland
Uşak Sportif players